Bembidion saxatile is a species of ground beetle native to Europe.

References

saxatile
Beetles described in 1827
Beetles of Europe